"You Wouldn't Believe" is a single by the band 311 that was first released on their album From Chaos in 2001, which has a music video featuring Shaquille O'Neal. The song appeared on Canadian MuchMusic Top 30 chart. "You Wouldn't Believe" also appeared on the compilation album, Greatest Hits '93–'03, in 2004.

The song also appeared in the video game, Gravity Games Bike: Street Vert Dirt.

A music video was released for the song and featured Shaquille O'Neal.

References

External links

2001 singles
311 (band) songs
Songs written by Nick Hexum
Songs written by SA Martinez
2001 songs